A Muslim tribe, found mainly in Mirpur District of Azad Kashmir. The own a group of villages including Kathar Dilawar in Dadyal, Mirpur District.

See also
 Azad Kashmir
 Ethnic Groups of Azad Kashmir

References

Mirpur District
Social groups of Jammu and Kashmir
Social groups of Pakistan